The Rio Grande is a river of Argentina.

See also
List of rivers of Argentina

References
 Rand McNally, The New International Atlas, 1993.
  GEOnet Names Server

Rivers of Argentina
Tributaries of the Paraguay River
Rivers of Jujuy Province